The Thomas County Public Library System (TCPLS) is a public library system serving Thomas County, Georgia. The headquarters of the system is the Thomas County Public Library located in Thomasville, Georgia. There is one Carnegie library in the system located in Boston, Georgia

TCPLS is a member of PINES, a program of the Georgia Public Library Service that covers 53 library systems in 143 counties of Georgia. Any resident in a PINES supported library system has access to the system's collection of 10.6 million books. The library is also serviced by GALILEO, a program of the University System of Georgia which stands for "GeorgiA LIbrary LEarning Online". This program offers residents in supported libraries access to over 100 databases indexing thousands of periodicals and scholarly journals. It also boasts over 10,000 journal titles in full text.

History
The Thomas County Public Library System was founded in 1988 after a decision to separate from the Moultrie-Colquitt Regional Library System. On its own Thomas County had three libraries and one bookmobile, but all were of small size and lacked the space needed for a county library system to grow. In order to increase the size of the library system to better serve the population a referendum was passed in 1992 to construct new libraries in Coolidge, Meigs, and Thomasville. The Boston Carnegie Library would additionally receive funding for a remodel and expansion, the Ochlocknee library would be remodeled, and the Pavo library would be replaced.

The new building in Thomasville was set to become the headquarters for the system. Construction of the 23,000 square foot building began in 1992 and was dedicated to the town of Thomasville in April 1993. The smaller 2,000 square foot branch libraries in Meigs and Coolidge opened at the end of that year. Due to the success of six newly constructed or renovated libraries, the library placed second in the nation for new library cards per capita in an American Library Association contest in 1994.

Boston Carnegie Library

On September 9, 1912, the mayor of Boston, Georgia, sent a request to Andrew Carnegie for library funding for his "growing and enterprising little city." The Carnegie Foundation accepted the petition and granted the town a loan of $6,000 on the condition the town of Boston pay an annual upkeep and maintenance fee of $600 on the building.

The building was designed largely by Charles Edward Choate and E.D. Ivey. Choate had previously designed Carnegie libraries in Eatonton and Fitzgerald, and Ivey was a native architect of Boston. The building has been in use as a library since its completion on December 3, 1912. During the 1992 referendum this building received an interior remodel and addition to the rear of the building.

Branches

Gallery

Library systems in neighboring counties
De Soto Trail Regional Library System to the north west.
Moultrie-Colquitt County Library System to the north.
Brooks County Public Library to the east.
Roddenbery Memorial Library to the west.

References

External links
PINES Catalog

County library systems in Georgia (U.S. state)
Public libraries in Georgia (U.S. state)
Libraries established in 1988
1988 establishments in Georgia (U.S. state)